Steven Frank may refer to:

 Steven Frank (biologist) (born 1957), evolutionary theorist
 Steve Frank (boxer) (born 1965), Guyanese Olympic boxer
 Steve Frank (soccer) (born 1948), American soccer midfielder
 Steve Frank (American football) (born 1950), American football player and coach

See also
Steve Franks, American screenwriter
Stephen Franks (born 1950), New Zealand lawyer